Henry O'Neill (1798–1880) was an Irish artist and antiquarian.

Career
Born in Clonmel, O'Neill lost both parents at a young age, and was tended by his sister, Sara O'Neill, a haberdasher who provided him an exceptional education. As from childhood he had evinced a talent for drawing, he was placed as a pupil in the Dublin Society's Schools in 1815. He applied himself eagerly to his work, and carried off the first premiums in every class he competed in. O'Neill identified himself with the popular political movements of the day, was a member of the Repeal Association, and during the imprisonment of O'Connell in Richmond gaol he painted a group of the Liberator and his fellow-prisoners, and later he did the well-known series of lithograph portraits of the Young Irelanders, Smith O'Brien and others. In 1863 was published his "Fine Arts of Ancient Ireland," illustrated with seven chromo-lithographs by himself and wood-cuts by G. Hanlon, an ambitious work on the antiquities of Ireland, in which he attempted to refute the conclusions of Petrie in his "Ecclesiastical Architecture of Ireland," and maintained the pagan origin of the Round Towers. In 1868 he published a brochure, "Ireland for the Irish," attacking landlordism. He projected a work on the Round Towers, of which only the first part, relating to the county of Dublin, was published: "The Round Towers of Ireland, by Henry O'Neill. Part the First, containing descriptions of the four Round Towers in the county of Dublin," published by M. H. Gill and Son, Sackville Street, 1877. His last work was a lithograph of the Cross of Cong. O'Neill was a constant exhibitor at the Royal Hibernian Academy down to 1879. Most of his works were in water-colour, but he occasionally painted in oils.  O'Neill is best remembered for the creation of lithographs portraying Celtic art and crosses in Ireland. They were published as Illustrations of Some of the Most Interesting Sculptured Crosses of Ancient Ireland (1859).

Memory
He died in poverty in 1880 and was buried in an unmarked grave in Glasnevin Cemetery. In 2016 a group of well-wishers came together to mark his grave with a Celtic Cross. A viewing and reception to dedicate the monument was held on Tuesday 2 August 2016.

References

External links
O'Neill at Celt Arts
Henry O'Neill of the Celtic Cross, biography by Peter Harbison, Dublin, Worldwell 2015
The revival of the Celtic Cross in the 19th & 20th centuries.
Irish Times, Commemorating Henry O'Neill
 

1798 births
1880 deaths
Burials at Glasnevin Cemetery
19th-century Irish painters
Irish male painters
People from County Tipperary
19th-century Irish male artists